The 2002 California Superintendent of Public Instruction election occurred on March 5, 2002. Jack O'Connell, defeated Katherine H. Smith, Lynne C. Leach, and Joe Taylor to replace Delaine Eastin.

Results

Results by county

See also
California state elections, 2002
State of California
California Department of Education

References

External links
VoteCircle.com Non-partisan resources & vote sharing network for Californians
Information on the elections from California's Secretary of State

2002 California elections
California Superintendent of Public Instruction elections
California